Bobby Smith (born June 24, 1982) is an American former javelin thrower. He won at the 2008 United States Olympic Trials with his personal best of 76.06 m, but was not selected, because he did not achieve the Olympic "A" standard.

External links

American male javelin throwers
1982 births
Living people
Place of birth missing (living people)
21st-century American people